The 1988 United States motorcycle Grand Prix was the second round of the 1988 Grand Prix motorcycle racing season. It took place on the weekend of April 8–10, 1988, at the Laguna Seca Raceway.

500 cc race report
The first U.S. GP in 23 years (the Daytona in 1965 was the previous).

Wayne Rainey was on pole. Through the first hairpin it was Wayne Gardner, Niall Mackenzie, Rainey, Kevin Schwantz, et al.

Eddie Lawson was down in 6th place, with Kevin Magee and Gardner up front. Lawson worked his way through the field, and passed both Gardner and Magee on the inside of Turn 2 (hairpin).

500 cc classification

References

United States motorcycle Grand Prix
United States
Motorcycle
United States